Emmanuel Zambazis (born April 24, 1997), sometimes known as Manolis Zambazis, is a Greek-Canadian soccer player who last played for York9 FC as a midfielder.

Club career

Youth
Zambazis began playing soccer at the age of six for Olympic Flame SC. He later played for East York SC and Mississauga SC.

Vaughan Azzurri
In 2014, Zambazis appeared for Vaughan Azzurri in League1 Ontario.

Iraklis
In August 2014, Zambazis signed with Greek Football League club Iraklis.

On 29 October 2015, Zambazis made his professional debut for Iraklis in a Greek Football Cup match against PAS Giannina. He subsequently made his league debut on 2 November as a late-game sub in a 2–0 win over Atromitos Athens in Superleague Greece.

By the end of the 2015–16 season Zambazis had made 9 league appearances for Iraklis, including one start, in addition to four appearances in the Greek Football Cup.

Zambazis failed to make another appearance for Iraklis in the 2016–17 season before being released upon the club's dissolution due to financial troubles.

York9 FC
After leaving Iraklis, Zambazis returned to Canada to play U Sports soccer with York University Men's Soccer Team in 2018. On November 12, 2018, he was drafted in the 2nd round of the inaugural Canadian Premier League U-Sports Draft by York9 FC, giving him the opportunity to trial with the club ahead of the 2019 CPL season. Zambazis officially signed with York 9 on April 24, 2019. He made his first start for York9 FC in a match against Pacific FC on July 17, 2019.

International career
Zambazis is eligible to represent Canada or Greece internationally.

Beginning in 2011, Zambazis participated in Canadian youth national team camps, ranging from the under-15 to under-20 level.
In February 2016 Zambazis played with Greece national under-19 football team in two friendly games against Czech Republic

In February 2017, Zambazis was called up to represent Canada at the 2017 CONCACAF U-20 Championship. Zambazis made his debut as a 75th-minute substitute in a 1–0 loss to Honduras. He later started in a 2–0 win over Antigua and Barbuda.

Personal life
Zambazis' father is Greek, originally from the village of Mavrokambos in Kastoria, West Macedonia and his mother is a Greek-Canadian from Toronto. His maternal uncle is Spiros Papathanasakis, the former owner of Iraklis F.C.

Career statistics

Club

External links

References

1997 births
Living people
Association football midfielders
Canadian soccer players
Greek footballers
Soccer players from Toronto
Canadian people of Greek descent
Iraklis Thessaloniki F.C. players
York Lions soccer players
York United FC draft picks
York United FC players
League1 Ontario players
Super League Greece players
Canadian Premier League players
Greece youth international footballers
Canada men's youth international soccer players
Vaughan Azzurri players